Canberra is home to a number of important musical venues and institutions, including the Llewellyn Hall performance venue, part of the Australian National University School of Music, and a number of music festivals including Canberra International Music Festival, Canberra Country Blues & Roots Festival and the National Folk Festival.
The local music scene includes many bars and nightclubs for local performers, mostly clustered in Dickson, Kingston and the City Centre.

Popular music 
Jack Lumsdaine wrote and recorded the songs Canberra's Calling to You and Queanbeyan in 1938, the sesquicentenary of European settlement.

Promoters and record labels in Canberra include Capital City, Dream Damage, Hardrush Music, Hellosquare Recordings, KP Records (Distributed internationally by WIDEawake Entertainment),Bad Sounds, Canberra Musicians Club, Canberra Music Workshop, Metaphysical Productions (Hip Hop), Vacant Room Records and Birds Love Fighting Records.

Venues 

Venues for music in Canberra that are bars, clubs, community organisations or businesses that hold music based events including halls and other spaces that are available for hire.
 The Abbey
 A Bite to eat
 Albert Hall
 ANCA Gallery
 ANU Bar (Lic/AA & 18+)
 ANU School of Music Big Band Room
 Balcony Room Tuggeranong
 The Basement (18+ & U18)
 Belconnen Arts Centre
 Belconnen Youth Centre
 Burbidge Outdoor Amphitheatre
 Burns Club, Kambah
 Canberra Theatre Centre (Lic/AA)
 Charnwood Scout Hall
 Civic Youth Centre (AA)
 Corroborree Park Function Room
 Crosbie Morrison Amphitheatre
 Deakin Scout Hall
 Deakin Soccer Club
 Downer Community Hall
 Eucalypt Lawns
 Evatt Scout Hall
 The Eye at Canberra Business Events Centre
 Floresco in the Gardens Cafe
 The Folkus (Lic/AA)
 The Front Gallery & Cafe
 Garran Scout Hall
 The George Harcourt Inn (18+)
 Gordon Darling Hall
 Goolabri
 The Great Hall
 Griffin Centre Hall
 Griffith Hall
 Gungaderral Homestead Hall
 Harmonie German Club
 Hippo
 Kendall Lane Theatre
 Kings Hall
King O'Malleys
 Lake Ginninderra Sea Scout Hall
 Lake View Ballroom
 Larry Sitsky Recital Room
 Llewellyn Hall
 Macarthur Scout Hall
 Majura Community Centre Function Room
 Majura Hall
 The Marble Foyer
 Members Dining Room at Old Parliament House
 The Merry Muse (18+)
 Narrabundah Hall
 Australian National Botanic Gardens Theatrette
 National Carillon
 National Library Foyer
 National Library Theatre
 New Acton Courtyard Stage and Cinema
 Northside Community Service
 Oaks Estate Community Centre
 The Old Canberra Inn (18+)
 Piano Bar
 PJ O'Reilly's Civic (18+)
 PJ O'Reilly's Tuggernong (18+)
 Polish White Eagle Club
 The Pot Belly (18+)
 Reflections Room Tuggeranong
 Richardson Scout Hall
 Rose Cottage Canberra
 Royal Theatre Canberra Convention Centre
Sideway
 Smiths Alternative
 Street Theatre 1
 Street Theatre 2
 Theatre 3
 Tilley's
 Transit Bar (18+)
 Tuggeranong Cabaret Space
 Tuggeranong Theatre
  Tuggeranong Youth Centre
 UC Refectory
 Waramanga/Fisher Scout Hall
 The Warehouse (AA)
 Wesley Music Centre
 Weston Creek Community Centre
 Westside Acton Park
 Woden Youth Centre (AA)
 Yarralumla Scout Hall
 KnightsBridge Penthouse

Other venues 
Halls and out door areas where events are usually arranged by an entity other than the venue owner or caretaker.

Art music 
Canberra hosts the Canberra Symphony Orchestra, which regularly performs at Llewellyn Hall at the ANU School of Music. Llewellyn Hall also features subscription series from touring groups such as the Australian Chamber Orchestra and Musica Viva Australia.

The Royal Military College Band is based at Duntroon. Other groups that present classical and jazz concerts in Canberra include the ANU School of Music, Art Song Canberra, Brew Guitar Duo, Canberra International Music Festival, Canberra City Band, The Canberra Jazz Club, The Gods Cafe, The Griffyn Ensemble, Guitar Trek, Salut Baroque!, Seven Harp Ensemble, Stopera, Australia|Stopera, and Wesley Music Centre.

Canberra is also home to a number of community and youth ensembles and organisations including Music For Canberra (resultant of a merge in 2015 between Key Arts Organisations Music For Everyone & Canberra Youth Music, funded by ArtsACT), the Canberra Choral Society, Canberra Chamber Orchestra, Musica da Camera, and the National Capital Orchestra.

Musical artists 

Some of Canberra's notable local artists include:
 Alchemist
 Armoured Angel
 The Aston Shuffle
 Artificial
 The Bedridden
Black Summer
Cellblock 69
Citizen Kay 
B(if)tek 
 Big Dave 
 Coda Conduct
 Dark Network 
 Dressed For A Funeral
 Doug Anthony Allstars
 The Ellis Collective
 Faceless (Fvceless)
 Franklyn B Paverty
 Genesis Owusu
 Groovy Daughter
 ARCHIE
 Hands Like Houses
 The Idea of North
 Koolism
 Omar Musa
Peking Duk
 Pod People
 Rubycon
 SAFIA
 Sidewinder
 Something Like This
 Sputnik Sweetheart
 St.Sinner
 Tactics
 Taka Perry
 Teen Jesus and the Jean Teasers
 The Way Hip Antelopess
 Blue Sarah Tonin

Music festivals 
 National Folk Festival (Australia)
 Corinbank Festival Years active: 2008, 2009, 2010 and 2012)
 You Are Here festival
 Canberra International Music Festival
 Metal for the Brain (years active: 1991–2006)
 Stonefest Years active: 2001–2010
 Spilt Milk (festival)

References

External links 

 Australian National University School of Music
 Music in the ACT – Linking Music Industry Resources in the ACT
 SOM Times – Art Music Journalism and Research, Canberra

Culture of Canberra
Australian music by city